Ginkgoopsida is a proposed class of gymnosperms defined by Sergei V. Meyen in 1984 to encompass Ginkgoales (which contains the living Ginkgo) alongside a number of extinct seed plant groups, which he considered to be closely related based on similarities of morphology of pollen, seeds, cuticles, short shoots and leaves. The monophyly of this group as a whole has been considered questionable by other authors. Other authors have used the class as a monotypic grouping, including only Ginkgoales.

References

Ginkgophyta
Plant classes